The Portland Trail Blazers are an American professional basketball team based in Portland, Oregon. The Trail Blazers play in the Northwest Division of the Western Conference in the National Basketball Association (NBA). The franchise entered the NBA in 1970, and is one of two major league franchise in Oregon. The Trail Blazers sold out 814 consecutive home games from 1977 through 1995, the second longest such streak for American professional sports teams which was broken July 9, 2011, by the Dayton Dragons. The team has played their home games at the Moda Center (formerly known as the Rose Garden), since the 1995–96 NBA season. The Trail Blazers are owned by the Paul G. Allen Trust chaired by Jody Allen, since the passing of owner Paul Allen in 2018. Since the team joined the NBA in 1970, it has won one NBA championship, three conference championships, six division championships, and has appeared in the NBA playoffs 34 times.

The team has advanced to the NBA Finals three times, winning the NBA Championship once, in 1977. The other NBA Finals appearances were in 1990 and 1992. The team has qualified for the playoffs in the majority of its seasons, including a streak of 21 straight appearances from 1983 to 2003. Six Hall of Fame players have played for the Trail Blazers (Lenny Wilkens, Bill Walton, Clyde Drexler, Dražen Petrović, Scottie Pippen, and Arvydas Sabonis), four of whom (Wilkens, Walton, Drexler, and Pippen) were recognized as one of the league's 50 greatest. Bill Walton is the franchise's most decorated player; he was the NBA Finals Most Valuable Player (MVP) in 1977, and the regular season MVP the following year. Four Blazer rookies (Geoff Petrie, Sidney Wicks, Brandon Roy. and Damian Lillard) have won the NBA Rookie of the Year award.  Two Hall of Fame coaches, Lenny Wilkens and Jack Ramsay, have coached the Blazers, and two others, Mike Schuler and Mike Dunleavy, have won the NBA Coach of the Year award with the team.

The Blazers have set several team and individual league records. They are the only team to have held a team scoreless during overtime on two occasions. In a game that went to four overtime periods, the Blazers and the Chicago Bulls combined to commit 87 personal fouls. In another four-overtime game, the Blazers and the Utah Jazz collected a combined 106 defensive rebounds. The Blazers set two records against the Golden State Warriors: the record for combined three-point field-goal attempts by both teams and the record for the most three-point field-goal attempts by one player. This page details the all-time statistics, records, and other achievements pertaining to the Portland Trail Blazers.

Individual records

Franchise leaders 
Bold denotes still active with team.

Italic denotes still active but not with team.

Points scored (regular season) (as of the end of the 2021–22 season) 

 Damian Lillard (18,708)
 Clyde Drexler  (18,040)
 LaMarcus Aldridge (12,562)
 Terry Porter (11,330)
 CJ McCollum (10,710)
 Clifford Robinson (10,405)
 Jerome Kersey (10,067)
 Jim Paxson (10,003)
 Geoff Petrie (9,732)
 Mychal Thompson (9,215)
 Rasheed Wallace (9,119)
 Sidney Wicks (8,882)
 Kevin Duckworth (7,188)
 Damon Stoudamire (6,745)
 Kiki Vandeweghe (6,698)
 Zach Randolph (6,202)
 Brandon Roy (6,107)
 Calvin Natt (5,738)
 Buck Williams (5,677)
 Arvydas Sabonis (5,629)

Other statistics (regular season) (as of the end of the 2021–22 season)

Individual accomplishments

All-Stars and All-Star Weekend participants
The NBA All-Star Game is played between the Eastern Conference All-Star Team and the Western Conference All-Star Team; the teams' starters are chosen through fan voting, and the teams' reserves are chosen by NBA teams' coaches.

All-Star Game selection
 Clyde Drexler, ten selections total, eight as a Blazer (1986, 1988–1994).
 Sidney Wicks, four selections total, all as a Blazer (1972–1975).
 Maurice Lucas, four selections total, three as a Blazer, (1977–1979).
 LaMarcus Aldridge, six selections, four as a Blazer (2012–2016, 2018)
 Damian Lillard, seven selections, all as a Blazer (2014, 2015, 2018–2021, 2023)
 Brandon Roy, three selections, all as a Blazer (2008–2010)
 Rasheed Wallace, two selections as a Blazer, four selections in total (2000–2001)
 Kevin Duckworth, two selections, both as a Blazer (1989, 1991)
 Jim Paxson, two selections, both as a Blazer (1983–1984)
 Geoff Petrie, two selections, both as a Blazer (1971, 1974)
 Terry Porter, two selections, both as a Blazer (1991, 1993)
 Bill Walton, two selections, both as a Blazer (1977–1978)
 Lionel Hollins, one selection as a Blazer (1978)
 Clifford Robinson, one selection as a Blazer (1994)
 Steve Johnson, one selection as a Blazer (1988) DNP due to injury
 Kermit Washington, one selection as a Blazer (1980)
NBA All-Star Game head coach
 Jack Ramsay, 1978
 Rick Adelman, 1991

All-Star Weekend participants
Rookie Challenge
Damian Lillard, 2012–13
LaMarcus Aldridge, 2007–08
Rudy Fernández, 2008–09
Greg Oden, 2008–09 (DNP)
Brandon Roy, 2006–07 and 2007–08
Arvydas Sabonis, 1995–96
Alvin Williams, 1997–98
Slam Dunk Contest
Damian Lillard
Clyde Drexler
Rudy Fernández
Jerome Kersey participated in four Slam Dunk Contests, finishing in second in 1987.
Anfernee Simons Winner in 2021.
Three-point Shootout
Clyde Drexler
Terry Porter
Clifford Robinson
Kiki Vandeweghe, 1987
Damian Lillard, 2014, 2019-2020, 2023 Winner
Wesley Matthews, 2015
CJ McCollum, 2016 & 2017
Seth Curry, 2019
Skills Challenge
Damian Lillard – Winner in 2013 and 2014

Individual awards
The NBA presents several annual awards to recognize its teams, players and coaches for their accomplishments. In addition, three honorary teams (All-NBA, All-Rookie, All-Defensive) are formed by voting to honor the best players, best rookies and best defenders respectively.

Most Valuable Player
 Bill Walton, 1977–78

Finals Most Valuable Player
 Bill Walton, 1976–77

Rookie of the Year
 Geoff Petrie, 1970–71 (shared with Dave Cowens)
 Sidney Wicks, 1971–72
 Brandon Roy, 2006–07
 Damian Lillard, 2012–13

Most Improved Player
 Kevin Duckworth, 1987–88
 Zach Randolph, 2003–04
 CJ McCollum, 2015–16

Sixth Man of the Year
 Clifford Robinson, 1992–93

J. Walter Kennedy Citizenship Award
 Terry Porter, 1992–93
 Chris Dudley, 1995–96
 Brian Grant, 1998–99
 Damian Lillard, 2018–19

Twyman–Stokes Teammate of the Year
 Damian Lillard, 2020–21

Kareem Abdul-Jabbar Social Justice Champion Award
 Carmelo Anthony, 2020–21

Coach of the Year
 Mike Schuler, 1986–87
 Mike Dunleavy, 1998–99

First Team, All-NBA
 Bill Walton, 1977–78,
 Clyde Drexler, 1991–92
 Damian Lillard, 2017–18

Second Team, All-NBA
 Bill Walton, 1976–77
 Maurice Lucas, 1977–78
 Jim Paxson, 1983–84
 Clyde Drexler, 1987–88, 1990–91
 Brandon Roy, 2008–09
 LaMarcus Aldridge, 2014–15
 Damian Lillard, 2015–16, 2018–19, 2019–20, 2020–21

Third Team, All-NBA
 Clyde Drexler,  1989–90
 Brandon Roy, 2009–10
 LaMarcus Aldridge, 2010–11, 2013–14
 Damian Lillard, 2013–14

First Team, All-Defensive
 Bill Walton, 1976–77, 1977–78
 Maurice Lucas, 1977–78
 Lionel Hollins, 1977–78
 Buck Williams, 1989–90, 1990–91

Second Team, All-Defensive
 Maurice Lucas, 1978–79,
 Bobby Gross, 1977–78
 Kermit Washington, 1979–80, 1980–81
 Buck Williams, 1991–92
 Scottie Pippen, 1999–2000
 Theo Ratliff, 2003–04

NBA All-Rookie First Team
 Sidney Wicks, 1971–72
 Lloyd Neal, 1972–73
 Lionel Hollins, 1975–76
 Mychal Thompson, 1978–79
 Ron Brewer, 1978–79
 Calvin Natt, 1979–80
 Kelvin Ransey, 1980–81
 Sam Bowie, 1984–85
 Arvydas Sabonis, 1995–96
 LaMarcus Aldridge, 2006–07
 Brandon Roy, 2006–07
 Damian Lillard, 2012–13

European awards and honors
European players in the NBA are currently eligible for three prestigious continent-wide awards for their performances with their club and national teams:
 Mr. Europa, awarded since 1976 by the Italian weekly magazine Superbasket
 Euroscar, awarded since 1979 by the Italian sports daily La Gazzetta dello Sport
 FIBA Europe Player of the Year Award, awarded since 2005 by FIBA Europe and based on voting by fans and a continent-wide panel of basketball experts, journalists, and coaches

Two Blazers players have won at least one of these awards while in Portland.
 Dražen Petrović won the Euroscar in 1989, a year that he started with Real Madrid and finished with the Blazers. Before coming to Portland, he swept the Euroscar and Mr. Europa in 1986, and after being traded to the New Jersey Nets, he won the Euroscar again in 1992 and won both awards posthumously in 1993.
 Arvydas Sabonis, like Petrović before him, won the Euroscar in the year he arrived from Real Madrid, 1995. Sabonis swept Mr. Europa and the Euroscar in 1997, and won the Euroscar again in 1999. During his previous career in the former Soviet Union, Sabonis won the Euroscar in 1984 and 1988, and both awards in 1985.

Hall of Fame and Top 50 players

The Naismith Memorial Basketball Hall of Fame, located in downtown Springfield, Massachusetts, honors players who have shown exceptional skill at basketball, all-time great coaches, referees, and other major contributors to the game. In 1996, the 50 Greatest Players in NBA History (also referred to as the NBA's 50th Anniversary All-Time Team or NBA's Top 50) were chosen by a panel of media, former players and coaches, current and former general managers and team executives. Five Trail Blazers players have been inducted into the Naismith Hall solely as players, and the team had four players selected to be in the NBA's Top 50 Players list. The Blazers have also had one coach inducted into the Naismith Hall exclusively in that capacity. Finally, Lenny Wilkens, who both played for and coached the Blazers, is one of only three individuals to have been inducted into the Naismith Hall in both roles.

Clyde Drexler.  Hall of Fame, Top 50.
Dražen Petrović.  Hall of Fame. Also a member of the FIBA Hall of Fame.
Arvydas Sabonis.  Hall of Fame. Also a member of the FIBA Hall of Fame.
Bill Walton.  Hall of Fame, Top 50.
Lenny Wilkens.  Hall of Fame (as both player and coach), Top 50.  Spent two years as head coach of the Blazers in the 1970s, including one year as player-coach. Also named one of the Top 10 coaches—the only person to make both lists.
Scottie Pippen. Hall of Fame, Top 50.
Coach Dr. Jack Ramsay — Hall of Fame, coached the team to their only NBA title in 1977.

The Blazers have had three players inducted to the FIBA Hall of Fame. In addition to Petrović (inducted as part of the inaugural class in 2007) and Sabonis (inducted in 2010), Fernando Martín, who played for the Blazers in the 1986–87 season, was inducted alongside Petrović.

Retired numbers
Several players (and others) have had their numbers retired by the team.  These are:

13 Dave Twardzik, G, 1976–80
14 Lionel Hollins G, 1975–80 (number retired April 18, 2007)
15 Larry Steele, G, 1971–80
20 Maurice Lucas, F, 1976–80 and 1987–88 (number retired November 4, 1988)
22 Clyde Drexler, G, 1983–95 (number retired March 6, 2001)
30 Bob Gross, F, 1975–82
30 Terry Porter, G, 1985–95 (number retired December 16, 2008)
32 Bill Walton, C, 1974–78
36 Lloyd Neal, C, 1972–79
45 Geoff Petrie, G, 1970–76

Two non-players also have honorary jerseys hanging in the rafters:

1 Larry Weinberg, Team founder-owner, 1970–88.  Jersey is honorary, as #1 is still used by team players.
77 Dr. Jack Ramsay, Head Coach, 1976–86.  Number selected in honor of 1976–77 season.

Oregon Sports Hall of Fame
Drexler, Lucas, Petrie, Twardzik, and Walton are members of the Oregon Sports Hall of Fame, which honors Oregon athletes, teams, coaches, and others who have made a significant contribution to sports in Oregon. Also inducted into the Hall are the 1976–77 team, and the following Trail Blazers' players:

 Danny Ainge (#9, G, 1990–92, also Oregon native)
Steve Johnson (#33, C, 1986–89, from Oregon State)
 Steve Jones (#23, G, 1975–76, from Portland and the University of Oregon)
 Jim Paxson (#4, G, 1980–87)

NBA records
Several league record performances have been recorded by members of the Trail Blazers or the team as a whole; or against the Trail Blazers by an opponent.  A partial list is as follows:
Most points scored in a game, franchise history
Damian Lillard scored 71 points in 39 minutes played against the Houston Rockets on February 26, 2023, setting a new franchise record and career high.
Most rebounds in a game, franchise history
Enes Kanter grabbed a franchise record of 30 rebounds against the Detroit Pistons on April 10, 2021.
Most assists in a game, franchise history
Rod Strickland tied the franchise record of 20 assists on March 30th, 1996, against the Dallas Mavericks.
Most steals in a game, franchise history
Brandon Roy stole the ball from the Washington Wizards 10 times on January 24th, 2009, setting a new franchise record.
Most blocked shots in a game, franchise history
Hassan Whiteside blocked 10 shots by the Chicago Bulls on November 29th, 2019, setting a new franchise record.
Most three-point field goals in a game, franchise history
Damian Lillard, made 13 three-point field goals against the Houston Rockets on February 26, 2023, setting a new franchise record and career high.
Most three-point field goals, half
The Trail Blazers made 12 three-point field goals against the New Orleans Hornets on January 14, 2005, and allowed the same amount against the Milwaukee Bucks on January 5, 2001.  In the latter game, Tim Thomas hit eight 3-pointers in a half, also an NBA record.
Most three-point field goal attempts, game (combined)
The Blazers and the Golden State Warriors combined for 69 three-point field goal attempts on April 15, 2005.  In that game, Damon Stoudamire of the Blazers attempted 21 three-point shots, also a record.
Largest margin of victory in overtime
The Blazers outscored the Houston Rockets 17–0 during the first (and only) overtime period on January 22, 1983.
Most games holding an opponent scoreless in overtime
In eight games, a team has been held scoreless in an overtime period; the Trail Blazers are the only NBA team to have held a team scoreless in overtime on two occasions, against the Rockets and the Indiana Pacers.
Most combined personal fouls, game (since the 1954–55 season)
The Blazers and the Chicago Bulls combined for 87 personal fouls in a game that went to four overtime periods on March 16, 1984.
Fewest combined personal fouls, game
The Blazers and the Phoenix Suns committed a combined 21 personal fouls on December 1, 2001.
Fewest turnovers, game
The Blazers committed three turnovers against the Suns on February 22, 1991.

Most combined defensive rebounds, game
Portland and the Utah Jazz combined for 106 defensive rebounds in a game that went to four overtime periods on October 18, 1974.

Most assists, 1st quarter
Steve Blake tied the NBA record for most assists in the 1st quarter with 14 against the LA Clippers on February 22, 2009.

Fewest points (combined) in the first half of a game
The Trail Blazers and the New Jersey Nets combined for 55 points in the first half of a game on November 28, 2004 (Portland led 30–25).
Fewest blocks (combined), game
On November 22, 1973 (against Seattle) and on November 25, 1979 (against Phoenix), the Blazers and their opponents combined for zero blocks, a record that has been matched eight other times.

References

External links

Accomplishments and records
National Basketball Association accomplishments and records by team